Gush is a sudden flow (as in a washout, storm surge, or blood gush) or excessive enthusiasm.

Gush may also refer to:

 Gush (album), 1995 music album by Lowlife
 Gush (band)
 George Gush, historian
 Richard Gush (1789–1858), South African settler
 William Gush (1813–1888), painter

Israel

 Gush Dan
 Gush Emunim
 Gush Etzion
 Gush Halav
 Gush Hispin
 Gush Katif
 Gush Shalom
 Yeshivat Har Etzion

Places in Iran
()
Gush, Razavi Khorasan
Gush, South Khorasan

See also
Bloc (disambiguation)
 
 
 Fāl-gūsh, the act of standing in a dark corner spot or behind a fence and listening to the conversations of passersby
 Gusher (disambiguation)
 Spurt (disambiguation)
 Squirt (disambiguation)